The Almaden Resident is a newspaper serving the San Jose area.  It is published weekly on Fridays and distributed in The Mercury News.

History 
The Almaden Resident was founded in 2003 as part of a group of weekly newspapers in the Metro Newspapers group, called Silicon Valley Community Newspapers. Dan Pulcrano and David Cohen co-founded Metro Newspapers in 1985. In 2001, Silicon Valley Community Newspapers, spun off from Metro Newspapers, under chief executive officer David Cohen. In 2005, Cohen sold Silicon Valley Community Newspapers to Knight Ridder, though he stayed on as publisher and chief executive for the SVCN papers.

In 2006, Knight Ridder was purchased by McClatchy Co., which immediately sold SVCN and the San Jose Mercury News to MediaNews Group.

Awards 
In 2005, Gregory Watkins of the Almaden Resident won 1st place in the category of Columns-Feature and in the category of Sports Story in the Greater Bay Area Journalism Awards. That same year, Sandy Brundage of the Almaden Resident  won 1st place in the category of News Story.

In 2007, Dick Sparrer of the Almaden Resident won 1st place in the category of Columns-Sports in the Greater Bay Area Journalism Awards.

In 2008, Emilie Crofton of the Almaden Resident won 2nd place for News Story and 1st place in the category of Feature Story of Serious Nature. Stephen Baxter won 2nd place for Business Story.

In 2009, in the Greater Bay Area Journalism Awards, Stephen Baxter of the Almaden Resident won 2nd place for Continuing Coverage of “Living Conditions in the Hoffman Via Monte Neighborhood.”

References 

Newspapers published in San Jose, California
Publications established in 2003
2003 establishments in California
Weekly newspapers published in the United States